Napier is a rural locality of  Warrumbungle Shire Council and a civil parish of Napier County New South Wales. and is at .

Neible is in the Warrembungle Ranges on Oakey Creek. The now closed Oakey Creek Railway Station is within the parish.

References

Localities in New South Wales
Geography of New South Wales
Central West (New South Wales)